{{Infobox electionph
| election_name = 2022 Makati mayoral election
| flag_image = 
| type = presidential
| ongoing = no
| previous_election = 2019 Makati local elections
| previous_year = 2019
| next_election = 2025 Makati local elections
| next_year = 2025
| election_date = 
| module = {{Infobox election
| embed = yes
| election_name = Mayoral election
| type = presidential

| image1 = 
| candidate1 = Abigail Binay
| party1 = MKTZNU
| running_mate1 = Monique Lagdameo
| time_zone = PhST
| popular_vote1 = 338,819
| percentage1 = 95.32

| module = {{Infobox election
| embed = yes
| election_name = Vice mayoral election
| type = presidential

| image1 = 
| candidate1 = Monique Lagdameo
| party1 = MKTZNU
| popular_vote1 = 314,070| percentage1 = 93.32| title = Mayor
| before_election = Abigail Binay
| before_party = UNA
| after_election = Abigail Binay
| after_party = MKTZNU
}}}}}}Local elections''' took place in Makati on Monday, May 9, 2022, as a part of the 2022 Philippine general election. Voters will elect candidates for Mayor, Vice Mayor, two representatives, and the sixteen councilors, eight per district, that would be members of the City Council.

Background
Incumbent Mayor Abigail Binay would seek for her third and final term. Her opponent was independent Joel Hernandez.

Incumbent Vice Mayor Monique Lagdameo would seek for her third and final term. Her opponent was Rodolfo Biolena, an independent candidate.

Incumbent First District Congressman Kid Peña would seek for his second term. His opponents were Minnie Antonio and Ferdinand Sevilla, both independent candidates.

Incumbent Second District Congressman Luis Campos would seek for his third and final term. His opponent was Ricardo Opoc, an independent candidate.

Tickets

Administration coalition

Primary opposition coalition

Opinion polling

For Mayor

For Vice Mayor

Results

Mayor
Incumbent Mayor Abigail Binay will seek for her third and final term, this time under the newly launched Makatizens United Party (MKTZNU). She will be challenged by independent Joel Hernandez. Abigail's younger sister, Marita Angeline "Anne" Binay-Alcantara, filed for the same position but later withdrew.

| colspan="5" |Source:

Vice Mayor
Incumbent Vice Mayor Monique Lagdameo will seek for her third and final term. She will be challenged by Rodolfo Biolena, an independent candidate.

| colspan="5" |Source:

District Representatives

First District
Romulo "Kid" Peña Jr. is the incumbent. His opponents are independent candidates Minnie Antonio and Ferdinand Sevilla.

Second District
Luis Jose Angel Campos Jr. is the incumbent. His opponent is independent candidate Ricardo Opoc.

City Council

First District

 

|-bgcolor=black
|colspan=5|

Second District

|-bgcolor=black
|colspan=5|

References

2022 Philippine local elections
Elections in Makati
May 2022 events in the Philippines
2022 elections in Metro Manila